Egton Bridge is a village in the Scarborough district of North Yorkshire, England. It lies within the North York Moors National Park, on the River Esk, between the villages of Glaisdale and Grosmont, about six miles south-west of Whitby, and on the route of the Esk Valley Walk.

The stone bridge that crosses the Esk was rebuilt in 1992, having been destroyed by flood in the 1930s.Trevor Elliott from New Zealand, did the falsework on the bridge rebuild, using a RMD 500 series system.

Amenities

The village is served by Egton railway station, on the Esk Valley Line, which also serves the nearby village of Egton.

There are two hotels in the village: the Horseshoe Hotel and the Postgate Inn. Bordering the village is Egton Estate, a shooting estate at the heart of which is Egton Manor, a Grade II Listed building built in 1869 by the Foster family, whose descendants still own and operate the property.

Shows and fairs

Egton Bridge Gooseberry Show
Egton Bridge is the setting for the oldest surviving gooseberry show in the country, established in 1800.  The show is held on the first Tuesday in August each year by the Egton Bridge Old Gooseberry Society.

Egton Show
Egton Horse and Agricultural Society runs an agricultural show each summer. It often features attractions such as a wrought iron and farrier display, a farmers market, show competitions for horse, cattle, sheep, goat, ferret, fur and feather classes, together with bee keeping, produce and handicraft and children's sections. It is one of the largest village shows in the country run by a band of voluntary helpers.

Postgate Rally
The annual Postgate Rally, in honour of Blessed Nicholas Postgate and the English and Welsh Martyrs of the Catholic Church, takes place each July.

Relics of Catholic martyr Nicholas Postgate
Egton Bridge has strong connections with Father Nicholas Postgate who was born there. The Roman Catholic Church of St Hedda's is located in the village. It contains the relics of Nicholas Postgate, a martyr executed in 1679, for continuing to practice his faith.

A primary school is attached to the church.

References

External links

 St Hedda's RC Primary School

Villages in North Yorkshire